Unidad de Inteligencia Financiera may refer to:
Unidad de Inteligencia Financiera (Argentina)
Unidad de Inteligencia Financiera (Mexico)